The women's 500 metres at the 2007 Asian Winter Games was held on January 30, 2007, at Wuhuan Gymnasium, China.

Schedule
All times are China Standard Time (UTC+08:00)

Results
Legend
DSQ — Disqualified

Heats

Heat 1

Heat 2

Heat 3

Heat 4

Heat 5

Quarterfinals

Heat 1

Heat 2

Heat 3

Heat 4

Semifinals

Heat 1

Heat 2

Finals

Final B

Final A

 Byun Chun-sa was awarded bronze because of no three-medal sweep per country rule.

References

Heats
Quarterfinals
Semifinals
Finals

External links
Official website

Women 0500